Squid Game is a South Korean streaming television series released worldwide on Netflix on September 17, 2021. Due to its positive critical reception and general worldwide popularity, the series has won and was nominated for numerous awards.

O Yeong-su's Golden Globe win made him the first Korean-born actor to win the award. The show's four SAG Award nominations also made history in it becoming the first non-English series and first Korean series to be nominated for Outstanding Performance by an Ensemble in a Drama Series. Individually, Lee Jung-jae became the first male actor from Asia and Korea to receive an individual SAG Award nomination and HoYeon Jung became the second actress of Asian as well as Korean descent to do the same. With both performers winning, the show made history in becoming the first non-English language television series to win at the SAG Awards.

Squid Game is also the first non-English television series to receive nominations and to win the Primetime Emmy Awards. It received 14 nominations, winning 6 of them, including Outstanding Lead Actor in a Drama Series, Outstanding Directing for a Drama Series, and Outstanding Guest Actress in a Drama Series. The winning of these awards respectively made actor Lee Jung-jae, director Hwang Dong-Hyuk, and actress Lee Yoo-mi to become the first Asians and Koreans to receive an Emmy.

Awards and nominations

References 

Awards
Squid Game